Ateak is a surname. Notable people with the surname include:

Simon Ateak (born 1993), Ghanaian cricketer
Vincent Ateak (born 1997), Ghanaian cricketer

See also
Atiq

Ghanaian surnames